Although phosphorus (15P) has 22 isotopes from 26P to 47P, only 31P is stable; as such, phosphorus is considered a monoisotopic element. The longest-lived radioactive isotopes are 33P with a half-life of 25.34 days and 32P with a half-life of 14.268 days. All others have half-lives of under 2.5 minutes, most under a second. The least stable is 25P with a half-life shorter than 30 nanoseconds.

List of isotopes

|-
| rowspan=2|26P
| rowspan=2 style="text-align:right" | 15
| rowspan=2 style="text-align:right" | 11
| rowspan=2|26.01178(21)#
| rowspan=2|43.7(6) ms
| β+ (63.2%)
| 26Si
| rowspan=2|(3+)
| rowspan=2|
| rowspan=2|
|-
| β+, p (36.8%)
| 25Al
|-
| style="text-indent:1em"|26mP
| colspan=3 style="text-indent:2em"|164.4(1) keV
| 120(9) ns
| IT
| 26P
|
|
|
|-
| rowspan=2|27P
| rowspan=2 style="text-align:right" | 15
| rowspan=2 style="text-align:right" | 12
| rowspan=2|26.999224(28)
| rowspan=2|260(80) ms
| β+ (99.93%)
| 27Si
| rowspan=2|1/2+
| rowspan=2|
| rowspan=2|
|-
| β+, p (.07%)
| 26Al
|-
| rowspan=3|28P
| rowspan=3 style="text-align:right" | 15
| rowspan=3 style="text-align:right" | 13
| rowspan=3|27.9923266(12)
| rowspan=3|270.3(5) ms
| β+ (99.99%)
| 28Si
| rowspan=3|3+
| rowspan=3|
| rowspan=3|
|-
| β+, p (.0013%)
| 27Al
|-
| β+, α (8.6×10−4%)
| 24Mg
|-
| 29P
| style="text-align:right" | 15
| style="text-align:right" | 14
| 28.9818004(4)
| 4.142(15) s
| β+
| 29Si
| 1/2+
|
|
|-
| 30P
| style="text-align:right" | 15
| style="text-align:right" | 15
| 29.97831349(7)
| 2.498(4) min
| β+
| 30Si
| 1+
|
|
|-
| 31P
| style="text-align:right" | 15
| style="text-align:right" | 16
| 30.9737619986(7)
| colspan=3 align=center|Stable
| 1/2+
| 1.0000
|
|-
| 32P
| style="text-align:right" | 15
| style="text-align:right" | 17
| 31.97390764(4)
| 14.268(5) d
| β−
| 32S
| 1+
|Trace
|
|-
| 33P
| style="text-align:right" | 15
| style="text-align:right" | 18
| 32.9717257(12)
| 25.35(11) d
| β−
| 33S
| 1/2+
|
|
|-
| 34P
| style="text-align:right" | 15
| style="text-align:right" | 19
| 33.9736459(9)
| 12.43(10) s
| β−
| 34S
| 1+
|
|
|-
| 35P
| style="text-align:right" | 15
| style="text-align:right" | 20
| 34.9733141(20)
| 47.3(8) s
| β−
| 35S
| 1/2+
|
|
|-
| 36P
| style="text-align:right" | 15
| style="text-align:right" | 21
| 35.978260(14)
| 5.6(3) s
| β−
| 36S
| 4−
|
|
|-
| 37P
| style="text-align:right" | 15
| style="text-align:right" | 22
| 36.97961(4)
| 2.31(13) s
| β−
| 37S
| (1/2+)
|
|
|-
| rowspan=2|38P
| rowspan=2 style="text-align:right" | 15
| rowspan=2 style="text-align:right" | 23
| rowspan=2|37.98430(8)
| rowspan=2|0.64(14) s
| β− (87.5%)
| 38S
| rowspan=2|
| rowspan=2|
| rowspan=2|
|-
| β−, n (12.5%)
| 37S
|-
| rowspan=2|39P
| rowspan=2 style="text-align:right" | 15
| rowspan=2 style="text-align:right" | 24
| rowspan=2|38.98629(12)
| rowspan=2|282(24) ms
| β− (73.2%)
| 39S
| rowspan=2|1/2+#
| rowspan=2|
| rowspan=2|
|-
| β−, n (26.8%)
| 38S
|-
| rowspan=2|40P
| rowspan=2 style="text-align:right" | 15
| rowspan=2 style="text-align:right" | 25
| rowspan=2|39.99129(16)
| rowspan=2|150(8) ms
| β− (84.2%)
| 40S
| rowspan=2|(2−,3−)
| rowspan=2|
| rowspan=2|
|-
| β−, n (15.8%)
| 39S
|-
| rowspan=2|41P
| rowspan=2 style="text-align:right" | 15
| rowspan=2 style="text-align:right" | 26
| rowspan=2|40.99465(13)
| rowspan=2|101(5) ms
| β− (70%)
| 41S
| rowspan=2|1/2+#
| rowspan=2|
| rowspan=2|
|-
| β−, n (30%)
| 40S
|-
| rowspan=2|42P
| rowspan=2 style="text-align:right" | 15
| rowspan=2 style="text-align:right" | 27
| rowspan=2|42.00108(34)
| rowspan=2|48.5(15) ms
| β− (50%)
| 42S
| rowspan=2|
| rowspan=2|
| rowspan=2|
|-
| β−, n (50%)
| 41S
|-
| rowspan=2|43P
| rowspan=2 style="text-align:right" | 15
| rowspan=2 style="text-align:right" | 28
| rowspan=2|43.00502(60)
| rowspan=2|35.8(13) ms
| β−, n
| 42S
| rowspan=2|1/2+#
| rowspan=2|
| rowspan=2|
|-
| β−
| 43S
|-
| 44P
| style="text-align:right" | 15
| style="text-align:right" | 29
| 44.01122(54)#
| 18.5(25) ms
| β−
| 44S
|
|
|
|-
| rowspan=2|45P
| rowspan=2 style="text-align:right" | 15
| rowspan=2 style="text-align:right" | 30
| rowspan=2|45.01675(54)#
| rowspan=2|24(7 (stat), 9 (sys)) ms
| β−, n (79%)
| 44S
| rowspan=2|1/2+#
| rowspan=2|
| rowspan=2|
|-
| β−, 2n (21%)
| 43S
|-
| 46P
| style="text-align:right" | 15
| style="text-align:right" | 31
| 46.02466(75)#
| 4# ms [>200 ns]
| β−
| 46S
|
|
|
|-
| 47P
| style="text-align:right" | 15
| style="text-align:right" | 32
| 47.03190(86)#
| 2# ms
| β−
| 47S
|
|
|

Radioactive isotopes

Phosphorus-32

32P, a beta-emitter (1.71 MeV) with a half-life of 14.3 days, is used routinely in life-science laboratories, primarily to produce radiolabeled DNA and RNA probes, e.g. for use in Northern blots or Southern blots. Because the high-energy beta particles produced penetrate skin and corneas, and because any 32P ingested, inhaled, or absorbed is readily incorporated into bone and nucleic acids, OSHA requires that a lab coat, disposable gloves, and safety glasses or goggles be worn when working with 32P, and that working directly over an open container be avoided in order to protect the eyes. Monitoring personal, clothing, and surface contamination is also required. In addition, due to the high energy of the beta particles, shielding this radiation with the normally used dense materials (e.g. lead), gives rise to secondary emission of X-rays via a process known as bremsstrahlung, meaning braking radiation. Therefore, shielding must be accomplished with low-density materials, e.g. Plexiglas, Lucite, plastic, wood, or water.

Phosphorus-33
33P is a beta-emitter (0.25 MeV) with a half-life of 25.4 days. It is used in life-science laboratories in applications in which lower energy beta emissions are advantageous such as DNA sequencing. 33P can be used to label nucleotides. It is less energetic than 32P, giving a better resolution. A disadvantage is its higher cost compared to 32P, as most of the bombarded 31P will have acquired only one neutron, while only some will have acquired two or more. Its maximum specific activity is 5118 Ci/mol.

External links
Phosphorus isotopes data from The Berkeley Laboratory Isotopes Project's

References

 
Phosphorus
Phosphorus